The Wasauksing Swing Bridge spans the South Channel, a narrow channel of Georgian Bay between the Rose Point on the mainland and an island commonly known as Parry Island (the Wasauksing First Nation), near Parry Sound, Ontario.

The bridge was built by the Ottawa, Arnprior and Parry Sound Railway to provide rail access to Depot Harbour. The bridge is sometimes referred to by its former name, the "Rose Point Swing Bridge".

A bridge was first built at this location in 1887 (some sources indicate 1888).  This was replaced by the current structure in 1912.  The twin-towered Rose Point station was formerly located immediately adjacent to this bridge on the mainland side.

The bridge was built for rail traffic only, but was modified for use by both rail and vehicle traffic at a later date.  Rail service ended and the rails were removed in 1989.  The bridge is now used for one lane of vehicular traffic, and still opens regularly to allow passage of boats.  There are traffic lights at each end both to regulate traffic in alternate directions and also (along with barricades), to provide protection when the bridge is open.  The bridge is the only road access for members of the Wasauksing First Nation, as well as many summer cottages located on the island.  A sidewalk has also been added to one side of the bridge.

In 1997, the bridge piers received a rehabilitation by Underground Services (1983) Ltd.  A speed limit of 5 km/h (speed over ground) was put in place in 1998 for vessels passing through this bridge.

References 

 
 
 

Canadian National Railway bridges in Ontario
Swing bridges in Canada
Bridges completed in 1912
Bridges in Parry Sound District
Rail infrastructure in Parry Sound District
Former railway bridges in Canada
1912 establishments in Ontario